Pliomelaena discosa is a species of tephritid or fruit flies in the genus Pliomelaena of the family Tephritidae.

Distribution
South Africa.

References

Tephritinae
Insects described in 1947
Diptera of Africa